Christian Hildebrandt  (born May 30, 1967 in Dragør) is a Danish composer.

See also
List of Danish composers

External links
www.hilc.dk
Christian Hildebrandt homepage

Danish composers
Male composers
1967 births
Living people
People from Dragør Municipality
University of Copenhagen alumni
21st-century Danish composers